Martin Frýdek (born 9 March 1969 in Hradec Králové) is a Czech football manager and former player, whose position was midfielder. He was lastly the manager of Czech 2. Liga side Vlašim.

He played for Czechoslovakia and later the Czech Republic, he played a total of 37 matches and scored four goals internationally. He started his career FC Hradec Králové before moving to AC Sparta Prague. This was followed by an unsuccessful two-year stint in Germany at Bayer 04 Leverkusen and MSV Duisburg after which he returned to the Czech 1. Liga, joining FK Teplice. He was forced to leave Teplice in 2003 and joined SC Xaverov.

He was a participant in the 1996 UEFA European Championship, where the Czech Republic won the silver medal.

He also represented his country at the 1997 FIFA Confederations Cup in Saudi Arabia, playing one match.

He joined Vlašim as manager in the summer of 2012. He left his post at Vlašim in April 2013, with the club five points above the relegation zone; he was replaced by former team-mate Michal Horňák.

References

External links
 
 
 

Living people
1969 births
Sportspeople from Hradec Králové
Association football midfielders
Czech footballers
Czech Republic international footballers
Czechoslovak footballers
Czechoslovakia international footballers
Dual internationalists (football)
UEFA Euro 1996 players
1997 FIFA Confederations Cup players
AC Sparta Prague players
Bayer 04 Leverkusen players
MSV Duisburg players
FK Teplice players
Czech First League players
Bundesliga players
Czech football managers
FC Sellier & Bellot Vlašim managers
Czech expatriate footballers
Expatriate footballers in Germany
Czech expatriate sportspeople in Germany
Czech National Football League managers